The 1988 International Formula 3000 Championship was contested over 11 rounds. 24 different teams, 69 different drivers, 5 different chassis and 2 different engines competed.

Drivers and teams

Calendar

Note:

Race 5, 6 and 7 stopped and restarted.

Final points standings

Driver

For every race points were awarded: 9 points to the winner, 6 for runner-up, 4 for third place, 3 for fourth place, 2 for fifth place and 1 for sixth place. No additional points were awarded.

Complete Overview

R=retired NS=did not start NQ=did not qualify NT=no time set in qualifying DIS(6)=disqualified after finishing in sixth place

References

International Formula 3000
International Formula 3000 seasons